The Havre Daily News  is an afternoon newspaper printed in Havre, Montana, US. The paper serves Hill County and the Hi-Line of north-central Montana, named for the northernmost line of the Burlington Northern Santa Fe Railway, originally built by the Great Northern Railway.

The paper was established in 1914. It has a full online edition by subscription, as well as a website, Instagram, Twitter account and Facebook page. Its circulation is 3,500 papers daily, published Monday through Friday.

In 2011, Stacy Mantle succeeded Martin Cody as publisher of the Havre Daily News, and in 2021 sports editor George Ferguson took over as publisher.

The paper's managing editor is Tim Leeds, and its newsroom staff consists of George Ferguson, Pam Burke and Patrick Johnston

References

External links
Havre Daily News website

Newspapers published in Montana
1914 establishments in Montana